Flight 222 is a 1985 Soviet docu-drama film directed by Sergei Mikaelyan. It is loosely based about the incidents during the defection of ballet dancer Alexander Godunov in 1979.

Plot
The film is set in New York City, based on the incident during defection of Alexander Godunov. Irina (Larisa Polyakova) is a part of a Soviet ice dancing tour on a visit to New York along with her husband. When Soviet authorities hear about her husband's defection, they put her on a plane to Moscow. However, U.S. Immigration Service stop the flight insisting that she is being taken out of the United States against her will. Irina's plane to Moscow awaits permission for take-off until a meeting is arranged with her husband at the airport.

Cast
Larisa Polyakova as Irina Panina, skater
Yury Schadrin as Ivan K., aircraft commander
Vilnis Bekeris as Michael Drake, employee of the US State Department
Valentin Bukin as Fedor, Head of Glaucus
Aivars Siliņš lv as Forrest, an employee of the US State Department

References

External links

1985 drama films
1985 films
Drama films based on actual events
Films directed by Sergei Mikaelyan
Lenfilm films
Russian aviation films
Russian drama films
Soviet drama films